Juan Ramón de la Fuente Ramírez (born 5 September 1951 in Mexico City) is a Mexican psychiatrist, academician and politician who served as Secretary of Health in the cabinet of President Ernesto Zedillo (1994–1999) and as rector of the National Autonomous University of Mexico (UNAM) from 1999 to 2007. He is currently a professor emeritus of Psychiatry at National Autonomous University of Mexico (UNAM) and Chairs the Board of the Aspen Institute Mexico. On 18 February 2019 he began his term as the Permanent Representative of Mexico to the United Nations.

Education

De la Fuente graduated from Medical School of Medicine from the National Autonomous University in 1976 and trained in Psychiatry at the Mayo Clinic in Rochester, Minnesota, United States. When he returned to Mexico he founded the Clinical Research Unit of the Mexican Institute of Psychiatry and joined the Faculty of UNAM's School of Medicine, where he was appointed Dean in 1991. In 1995 he was also elected President of the Mexican Academy of Sciences and a few years later he was appointed Secretary of Health by President Zedillo. In 1999, he resigned his cabinet post to be appointed Rector of the National Autonomous University of Mexico and in 2003 he was reappointed for a second term. In 2008 he was elected President of the International Association of Universities at UNESCO and was called by Ban Ki-moon to be member of the Council of the United Nations University in Tokyo. He sits in several boards in México and abroad, such as El Universal, an influential newspaper in Mexico City. Also, in 2008 he was elected as President of the International Association of Universities.

Awards and recognition

He has written over two hundred papers and fourteen books, and has received numerous awards and honorary degrees such as the Distinguished Alumnus Award from the Mayo Clinic, the Presidential Award for Excellence of the University of Texas and a Doctorate on Humane Letters from Arizona State University, amongst many others. He also received from President Vicente Fox the National Prize for Arts and Sciences (Mexico), the highest recognition of Mexico's Government. Dr. de la Fuente is one of the most respected figures in Mexican society.

References

1951 births
Living people
Mexican psychiatrists
Mexican Secretaries of Health
People from Mexico City
National Autonomous University of Mexico alumni
Members of the Mexican Academy of Sciences
National Prize for Arts and Sciences (Mexico)
Permanent Representatives of Mexico to the United Nations